The Fast Red Road: A Plainsong is a novel by Native American writer Stephen Graham Jones. It was his debut novel, published in 2000.

The novel was originally titled Golius: A Failed Sestina and used as Stephen's dissertation while attending Florida State University. Jones started writing the book after his dissertation director introduced him to Houghton-Mifflin editor Jane Silver at a conference. Jones pitched Silver a book, lying about having already written it. Silver expressed interest in working on the book and asked to see it; Jones started writing it later that day.

Awards and nominations
The novel won the following awards:
Independent Publishers Award for Multicultural Fiction

References

External links
Cannibalizing Culture - Patrick Schabe - Popmatters.com

2000 American novels
Novels by Stephen Graham Jones
Native American novels
Novels set in New Mexico
2000 debut novels
FC2 books